Joseph I Galesiotes (? – 23 March 1283) was a Byzantine monk who served twice as Patriarch of Constantinople, from 1266 to 1275 and from 1282 until shortly before his death in 1283. He is most notable as an opponent of Emperor Michael VIII Palaiologos' plans to unite the Eastern Orthodox Church with the Catholic Church, for which he is recognized as a confessor by the Orthodox Church.

Life 
After being married for eight years he became a monk. He served as a lector (anagnostes) from 1222 until 1254, and in 1259/60 became abbot of the Lazaros monastery on Mount Galesios. Joseph became the confessor to Emperor Michael VIII Palaiologos (reigned 1259–82). In this capacity, he was sent in 1264 by Michael to Patriarch Arsenios Autoreianos to seek the lifting of the Patriarch's excommunication of the Emperor on account of the blinding of the young John IV Laskaris (r. 1258–61). Arsenios remained intransigent, however, and at length Michael deposed him and on 28 December 1266 named Joseph to the patriarchate. Joseph soon issued a pardon to the emperor, which enraged the supporters of his predecessor and exacerbated the so-called "Arsenite schism".

In 1272 Joseph officiated at the coronation of Andronikos II Palaiologos as co-emperor, but soon fell out with Michael VIII over the latter's projected union of the Eastern Orthodox Church with the Catholic Church. For Michael, who was threatened by the ambitions of Charles of Anjou, the Union was the sole instrument for preventing a full-scale assault by the Western powers on his empire, but the Byzantine clergy and people almost universally opposed the concessions made to the Papacy on matters of doctrine and Papal supremacy. In 1273, Joseph swore an oath not to accept the Union under the terms set out by the Pope, and in early 1274, as the Byzantine delegation prepared to travel to Italy to effect the Union, retired from his official duties to the Peribleptos Monastery.

Joseph resigned his office on 9 January 1275, retiring to the Monastery of Anaplous and later to the town of Chele on the Black Sea coast, before returning to Constantinople in summer 1280 to the Monastery of Kosmidion. Following the death of Michael VIII in 1282, Andronikos II reversed his father's ecclesiastical policies, deposing the pro-Unionist John XI Bekkos and recalling Joseph to the patriarchate (31 December 1282). Joseph's poor health however forced him to resign his office shortly before his death on 23 March 1283.

Due to his staunch anti-Unionite stance, he was declared a confessor by his successor Gregory II. He was later canonized, and is celebrated on 30 October.

References

Sources 
 
 
 

13th-century births
1283 deaths
13th-century patriarchs of Constantinople
Byzantine saints of the Eastern Orthodox Church
13th-century Christian saints
Byzantine abbots